Katerina Vladimirovna Gordeeva (born 23 March 1977) is a Russian journalist, documentary writer and author. She is most known for the work involved with Russia's NTV Documentary films from 2003 until 2012. Since 2005, she has directed and released several documentaries. Gordeeva's documentaries cover a list of different topics including health, family and social issues. Her first documentary Ruble's Wives was released in 2005.

Early life and education 
Gordeeva was born in Rostov-on-Don in 1977. She was always interested in becoming a paediatric surgeon. She worked as a nurse throughout the summer holidays when she was 12 years old in the 20th City Hospital in Rostov-on-Don. She then went to work at the department of neonatal pathology in Rostov NIIAP.

She started her career in journalism when she became a correspondent for one of Rostov-on-Don's local newspapers 'City N'. In 1993, Gordeeva tried to study in Paris but with changes to her place in Rostov-on-Don, she went back home. In 1994, Gordeeva then studied Journalism at the Rostov State University in Rostov-on-Don. In 1999, she graduated from the Faculty of Journalism at Moscow's State University.

Career

Television 
Gordeevas career in Television started in 1995. She worked as an editor, correspondent and author of the Russian TV Program 'Theme/Тема' until 1996. In 1997, she worked as one of the authors for the NTV program 'Originally from childhood'.

From 1997 to 1999, she worked as a parliamentary correspondent for the TV program 'Day Seven' with then later working at the Russian Service of the BBC in 2001 under the pseudonym Maria Rasskazova.

In July 2002, she reverted to her own name to start working at Russia's TVS TV Channel. This channel however ceased broadcast in 2003. From 2004 until 2006, she worked as a correspondent at Russia's NTV Program 'Today'.

Documentary career 
Gordeeva started producing her first documentary film in 2005. Her first film was titled 'Ruble's Wives'. Since then, she has released various documentaries and films about various topics inside Russia. Most of the films are focused on families and people.

Filmography 
 The Man from Nowhere (Человек из ниоткуда) 2018 
 Change one Life (Измени одну жизнь) 2017
 Joseph's Children (Дети Иосифа) 2015
 Vote (Голоса) 2014
 The girls are flying (Девочки летят) 2012
 Defeat Cancer (Победить рак) 2012
 The ZERO Generation (Поколение НОЛЬ) 2010
 We are not vegetables (Мы не овощи) 2010
 Nevsky (Невский) 2009
 Further ... Silence (Дальше — тишина) 2009
 When leaving, extinguish the light (Уходя, гасите свет) 2009
 Explosion (Взрыв) 2008
 Kind People (Люди добрые) 2007
 Saddam - Invited to be executed (Саддам. Приглашение на казнь) 2007
 Knockin 'on Heaven (Достучаться до небес) 2006
 Life on Loan (Жизнь взаймы) 2005
 Ruble's Wives (Рублёвские жёны) 2005

Personal life 
Gordeeva married Nikolay Solodnikov in 2014. She has four children. Gordeeva speaks English, French and Italian. She resides in Latvia as well as Russia.

References 

Russian women journalists
1977 births
Living people
Mass media people from Rostov-on-Don
Moscow State University alumni
Journalism as a Profession Awards winners
Redkollegia award winners
Russian YouTubers
Russian activists against the 2022 Russian invasion of Ukraine
Russian documentary filmmakers
People listed in Russia as foreign agents